Friedrich Jeremias Witt (November 8, 1770 – January 3, 1836) was a German composer and cellist. He is perhaps best known as the likely author of a Symphony in C major known as the Jena Symphony, once attributed to Ludwig van Beethoven.

Biography
Witt was born in 1770, the same year as Beethoven, and was a German composer of considerable stature in his time.
He was born in the Württemberg village of Niederstetten, the son of a cantor and court clerk. Witt became a cellist (some accounts say a violinist) in the court orchestra of Oettingen-Wallerstein when he was nineteen, taking composition lessons there with Antonio Rosetti, that is, the Bohemian-born Anton Rösler. Witt was most famous in his lifetime for his oratorio Der leidende Heiland (The Suffering Saviour), securing an appointment as Kapellmeister for the Prince of Würzburg, and later for the theater, where he stayed until his death. He also wrote two operas: Palma (1804) and Das Fischerweib (1806). His other compositions include concertos, church music, chamber music and symphonies. His best-known work, a symphony in C major known as the Jena, is modeled after the Symphony No. 97 by Joseph Haydn.

Stephen Fisher compiled a thematic index of Witt's symphonies.

Facts

In the Finale of his Symphony No. 16 in A major, Witt cites the French Revolutionary "Ça ira" motif.

Notes

Sources
 Opera at Stanford University

Discography

 Symphonies Nos. 6 and 9, Flute Concerto. Hamburg Symphony Orchestra, Johannes Moesus. MDG 329 1299-2
 Septet in F major. Berlin Philharmonic Octet. Berlin Classics. Disc includes Beethoven's Opus 20 Septet.
 Horn Concertos. Concerto Amsterdam. Arts Music. Disc includes horn concertos by Leopold Mozart, Pokorny and Rosetti.
 Quintet for Piano and Winds. James Campbell,  James Mason,  James Sommerville,  James McKay,  Anton Kuerti. Cbc Musica Viva.  Disc includes piano and wind quintets by Mozart (K. 452), and Beethoven (Op. 16).
 Symphonies in C major and A major, Flute Concerto in G major, Op. 8. Sinfonia Finlandia Jyväskylä, Patrick Gallois Flute and conductor. Naxos 8.572089
 Chamber Works for Winds & Strings. Consortium Classicum. Disc includes quintet by Prince von Löwenstein-Wertheim-Freudenberg Carl Friedrich

External links
 

1770 births
1836 deaths
German classical cellists
German male classical composers
German opera composers
Male opera composers
People from Main-Tauber-Kreis